George Richard Atkins (born 18 August 1991) is a British former track and road racing cyclist, who rode professionally between 2014 and 2016. He was a member of British Cycling's Olympic Development Programme. In 2009 he won the junior race at the British National Road Race Championships. At the 2010 Commonwealth Games he won the silver medal in the track points race. After the Commonwealth Games Atkins took a break from the sport but returned in the summer of 2011.

After one season with Raleigh Atkins was listed as part of the inaugural squad of the  team for the 2015 season.

Major results

2007 
 1st Criterium, European Youth Summer Olympic Festival
 3rd Individual pursuit, National Youth Track Championships
2008
 3rd Scratch, National Junior Track Championships
2009
 1st  Road race, National Junior Road Championships
 National Junior Track Championships
1st  Madison (with Dan McLay)
1st  Individual pursuit
2nd Points race
2nd Scratch
3rd Kilo
 UEC European Under-23 Track Championships
2nd Team pursuit
3rd Individual pursuit
2010
 National Track Championships
1st  Points race
2nd Individual pursuit
3rd Madison (with Erick Rowsell)
 2nd Points race, Commonwealth Games
2011
 1st Scottish National Hill Climb Championships
 1st Drummond Trophy
 2nd Time trial, National Under-23 Road Championships
 3rd Time trial, Scottish National Road Championship
2012
 National Track Championships
1st  Points race
1st  Team pursuit (with Team 100% ME) 
3rd Omnium 
3rd Madison (with Owain Doull)
 1st Jock Wadley Memorial 
 2nd Time trial, National Under-23 Road Championships
2013
 National Track Championships
1st  Madison (with Jon Mould)
3rd Points race
 1st Overall British Cycling Elite Circuit Series
1st Stockton Festival of Cycling Criterium
3rd Time trial, National Under-23 Road Championships
2014
 1st Stockton Festival of Cycling Criterium
 1st David Campbell Memorial Road Race
 2nd Wales Open Criterium
 2nd Leicester Castle Classic
2015
 3rd National Circuit Race Championships
 3rd Leicester Castle Classic
 3rd Betty Pharoah Memorial Legstretchers Road Race

References

External links

1991 births
Living people
English male cyclists
Cyclists at the 2010 Commonwealth Games
Commonwealth Games silver medallists for England
Sportspeople from Leicester
Commonwealth Games medallists in cycling
Medallists at the 2010 Commonwealth Games